Isaac Jacob Schoenberg (April 21, 1903 – February 21, 1990) was a Romanian-American mathematician, known for his invention of splines.

Life and career
Schoenberg was born in Galați to a Jewish family, the youngest of four children. He studied at the  University of Iași, receiving his M.A. in 1922. From 1922 to 1925 he studied at the Universities of Berlin and Göttingen, working on a topic in analytic number theory suggested by Issai Schur. He presented his thesis to the University of Iași, obtaining his Ph.D. in 1926. In Göttingen, he met Edmund Landau, who arranged a visit for Schoenberg to the Hebrew University of Jerusalem  in 1928. During this visit, Schoenberg  began his work on total positivity and variation-diminishing linear transformations. In 1930, he returned from Jerusalem, and married Landau's daughter Charlotte in Berlin.

In 1930, he was awarded a Rockefeller Fellowship, which enabled him to go to the United States, visiting the University of Chicago, Harvard, and the Institute for Advanced Study in Princeton, New Jersey. From 1935, he taught at Swarthmore College and Colby College. In 1941, he was appointed to the faculty at the University of Pennsylvania. During 1943–1945 he was released from U. Penn. in order to perform war work as a mathematician at the Aberdeen Proving Ground. It was during this time that he initiated the work for which he is most famous, the theory of splines.

In 1966 he moved to the University of Wisconsin–Madison where he became a member of the Mathematics Research Center. He remained there until he retired in 1973. In 1974 he won a Lester R. Ford Award.

Books

Papers
He wrote about 175 papers on many disparate subjects. Around 50 of these were on Splines. He also wrote on Approximation theory, the Kakeya problem, Polya frequency functions, and a problem of Edmund Landau.
His coauthors included John von Neumann, Hans Rademacher, Theodore Motzkin, George Polya, A. S. Besicovitch, Gábor Szegő, Donald J. Newman, Richard Askey, Bernard Epstein and Carl de Boor.

See also 
 Perfect spline

References 

 Schoenberg, Contributions to the problem of approximation of equidistant data by analytic functions, Quart. Appl. Math., vol. 4, pp. 45–99 and 112–141, 1946.

External links 
 
 
 Schoenberg, Isaac Jacob (HAT = History of Approximation Theory website)
 Archives Spotlight: The Isaac Jacob Schoenberg Papers

1903 births
1990 deaths
20th-century American mathematicians
Romanian mathematicians
People from Galați
Romanian people of Jewish descent
Romanian emigrants to the United States
Alexandru Ioan Cuza University alumni
Swarthmore College faculty
University of Pennsylvania faculty
Mathematicians at the University of Pennsylvania
University of Wisconsin–Madison faculty
Rockefeller Fellows